The 1958 NCAA College Division football season was the third season of college football in the United States organized by the National Collegiate Athletic Association at the NCAA College Division level.

Conference standings

Rankings

Small college poll
In 1958, United Press International (UPI) conducted a "small college" coaches' poll for the first time. Mississippi Southern, which had beaten NC State and VPI en route to a 9–0 record, was ranked first from start to finish.

United Press International (coaches) final poll
Published on December 4

See also
 1958 NCAA University Division football season
 1958 NAIA football season

References